The Ireland cricket team toured England in May 2017 to play two One Day International (ODI) matches. The matches were part of England's preparation for the 2017 ICC Champions Trophy, scheduled to be held in England and Wales the following month. It was the first time that the two teams played each other in England. England won the series 2–0.

Squads

ODI series

1st ODI

2nd ODI

References

External links
 Series home at ESPN Cricinfo

2017 in English cricket
2017 in Irish cricket
International cricket competitions in 2017
Irish cricket tours of England